Mario Chih-Hsiung Karl Deng is a German-Chinese cardiologist specialized in the care of patients with advanced heart failure. Deng is a Professor of Medicine in the David Geffen School of Medicine at the University of California, Los Angeles.

Biography 
Deng was born in West Berlin as the only child of a Chinese forestry scientist (father) and a German lawyer (mother). In 1992–1993, he spent time as a post-doctoral fellow at Stanford University for training in advanced heart failure, transplantation cardiology and molecular cardiology. From 1992 to 2000, Deng became a professor at the University of Münster, building the Interdisciplinary Heart Failure and Heart Transplant Program of Muenster University.  In 2000, Deng joined Columbia University as the Director of Cardiac Transplantation Research.  In 2001, Deng was appointed the founding Medical Director of the Mechanical Circulatory Support Database  of the International Society for Heart and Lung Transplantation. In 2011, he was recruited to the University of California, Los Angeles to re-build the Heart Transplant Program as Director of the Advanced Heart Failure, Mechanical Circulatory Support, and Heart Transplant Program.

Career

Multidisciplinary care and clinical outcomes in advanced heart failure 
Deng was responsible for the conduct and publication of the Comparative Outcomes and Clinical Profiles in Transplantation (COCPIT Study) which contributed to the discussion about reorganization of the heart allocation rules in Europe and the United States.

Development of a blood test to detect cardiac rejection 
Deng co-developed the first in history diagnostic and prognostic peripheral blood mononuclear cell gene expression profiling biomarker test in heart transplantation medicine that gained US-FDA-regulatory clearance  and international evidence-based medicine guideline acceptance  to rule out rejection without invasive biopsies

Development of a blood test to predict survival in heart failure 
Since 2005, the Deng lab started to develop a genomic blood test to better predict outcomes in patients with various forms of advanced heart failure

Development of a humanistic framework in high-tech medicine
The creation of a framework to personalize high–tech modern medicine encounters is reflected in Deng's research collaboration with Professor Federica Raia (UCLA Graduate School of Education and Information Studies and David Geffen School of Medicine) in the "Relational Medicine" project. Deng is Co-Founder and Co-President of the Relational Medicine Foundation.

Selected publications
 Deng MC, De Meester JMJ, Smits JMA, Heinecke J, Scheld HH, on behalf of COCPIT Study Group. The impact of heart failure severity on outcome in cardiac transplant candidates. Br Med J 2000;321:540–545. PMCID: PMC4133547.
 Deng MC, Edwards LB, Taylor DO, Hertz MI, Rowe AW, Keck B, Kormos RL, Naftel D, Kirklin J. Mechanical circulatory support device database of the international society for heart and lung transplantation: third annual report-2005. J Heart Lung Transplant 2005;24:1182–1187. 
Deng MC, Eisen HJ, Mehra RM, Billingham M, Marboe CC, Berry G, Kobashigawa J, Johnson FL, Starling RC, Murali S, Pauly DF, Baron H, Wohlgemuth JG, Woodward RN, Klingler TM, Walther D, Lal PG, Rosenberg S, Hunt SA, for the CARGO Investigators. Non-invasive detection of rejection in cardiac allograft recipients using gene expression profiling. Am J Transplant 2006;6:150–160. .
Deng MC, Elashoff B, Pham MX, Teuteberg JJ, Kfoury AG, Starling RC, Cappola TP, Kao A, Anderson AS, Cotts WG, Ewald GA, Baran DA, Bogaev RC, Shahzad K, Hiller D, Yee J, Valantine HA; for the IMAGE Study Group. Utility of Gene Expression Profiling Score Variability to Predict Clinical Events in Heart Transplant Recipients. Transplantation. 2014 Jan 31. [Epub ahead of print]  [PubMed - as supplied by publisher]
Bondar G, Togashi R, Cadeiras M, Schaenman J, Cheng RK, Masukawa L, Hai J, Bao TM, Chu D, Chang E, Bakir M, Kupiec-Weglinski S, Groysberg V, Grogan T, Meltzer J, Kwon M, Rossetti M, Elashoff D, Reed E, Ping PP, Deng MC. Association between preoperative peripheral blood mononuclear cell gene expression profiles, early postoperative organ function recovery potential and long-term survival in advanced heart failure patients undergoing mechanical circulatory support. PLoS One. 2017 Dec 13;12(12). PMCID: PMC5728510.
Raia F, Deng MC. Relational Medicine – Personalizing Modern Healthcare: The Practice of High-Tech Medicine As A RelationalAct. World Scientific Publishing/Imperial College Press, London/Singapore 2014 Deng 2014C

References

Year of birth missing (living people)
Living people
German cardiologists
American cardiologists
People from Berlin
German emigrants to the United States
German people of Chinese descent
Academic staff of the University of Münster
Columbia University faculty
David Geffen School of Medicine at UCLA faculty